In phonetics, palato-alveolar or palatoalveolar consonants are postalveolar consonants, nearly always sibilants, that are weakly palatalized with a domed (bunched-up) tongue.  They are common sounds cross-linguistically and occur in English words such as ship and chip.

(For the affricates, tied symbols   or unitary Unicode symbols   are sometimes used instead, especially in languages that make a distinction between an affricate and a sequence of stop + fricative.) Examples of words with these sounds in English  are shin , chin , gin  and vision  (in the middle of the word).

Like most other coronal consonants, palato-alveolar consonants can be articulated either with the tip or blade of the tongue, and are correspondingly called apical or laminal.  Speakers of English use both variants, and it does not appear to significantly affect the sound of the consonants.

Similarity to other sounds

These sounds are similar to the alveolo-palatal sibilants  and to the retroflex sibilants , all of which are postalveolar consonants.  In palato-alveolars the front of the body of the tongue is domed, in that the front of the tongue moves partway towards the palate, giving the consonant a weakly palatalized sound.  They differ from other postalveolars in the extent of palatalization, intermediate between the fully palatalized alveolo-palatals and the unpalatalized retroflexes.

It is generally only within sibilants that a palato-alveolar articulation is distinguished. In certain languages nasals or laterals may be said to be palato-alveolar, but it is unclear if such sounds can be consistently distinguished from alveolo-palatals and palatalized alveolars.  Even in the case of sibilants, palato-alveolars are often described simply as "post-alveolars" or even as "palatals", since they do not contrast with these sounds in most languages.

Palato-alveolar consonants in the IPA
The two palato-alveolar fricatives with letters in the International Phonetic Alphabet, and their common affricate homologues in English, are:

See also

 Place of articulation
 Postalveolar consonant
 Alveolo-palatal consonant
 Retroflex consonant
 Hush consonant
 List of phonetics topics

References

Place of articulation
Postalveolar consonants